Elliott Heads is a coastal town and locality in the Bundaberg Region, Queensland, Australia.

Geography 

Elliott Heads is surrounded by small crop and sugarcane farms.

History

The district was officially known as Springfield until it was renamed Elliott Heads on 1 November 1967 by the Queensland Place Names Board. The name refers to the area being at the mouth of the Elliott River where it flows into the Coral Sea. The river in turn takes its name from Gilbert Eliott (1796-1871) (note spelling) public servant, pastoralist and politician, Speaker of Queensland Legislative Assembly 1860–70, Member for Wide Bay 1860–70.

Elliott Heads Post Office opened by January 1952 and closed in 1986.

The original Elliott Heads Kiosk, a small café located on the esplanade next to the Elliott River mouth, closed down on 15 July 2014 and the Driftwood café opened nearby on 4 September 2014.

Airy Park State School (sometimes spelled Airey Park) opened on 16 January 1913. The land for the school was donated by Mr Breusch who had named his first property Airy Park after Peter Airey, a Labor politician. In 1966, the school was enlarged by the relocation of the former Electra State School building. The name of the school was changed to Elliott Heads State School on 23 March 1967.

The Elliott Heads Bowls Club was opened on 12 June 1976.

Amenities 
Elliott Heads is a popular recreation area, offering both surf and still water areas for swimming, fishing, sailboarding, jet skiing, stand-up paddleboarding and other water activities.  The Elliott Heads Bowls Club offers bowling greens, pokies, meals and drinks. There is a popular caravan park next to the surf beach with amenities. The local Surf Life Saving Club is located near the surf beach. The Driftwood Café serves food and drink, and is located next to the mouth of the river. There is also a general store which sells food and other items.

Education 

Elliott Heads State School is a government primary (Prep-6) school for boys and girls at 143 Breusch Road. In 2017, the school had an enrolment of 103 students with 8 teachers (7 full-time equivalent) and 10 non-teaching staff (5 full-time equivalent).

There are no secondary schools in Elliott Heads; the nearest is in Kepnock ( away) and there are other options in Bundaberg.

References

External links

 
 
Bundaberg Region – Elliott Heads

Towns in Queensland
Coastal towns in Queensland
Headlands of Queensland
Bundaberg Region
Localities in Queensland